Tsilla Chelton (21 June 1919 – 15 July 2012) was a French actress of theatre and film, famous for playing the main role in 1990 film Tatie Danielle, in which she was nominated for a Cesar award  and as an elderly Dominican in Soeur Sourire.

Biography
Tsilla Schilton was born in Jerusalem but spent her childhood in Belgium. The daughter of French parents of Jewish heritage, she lost her mother at the age of 6, and followed her father to Antwerp. She moved to Switzerland during World War II before settling in Paris. Married to decorator Jacques Noël, she had 4 children.

Attracted by theatre, she started acting in Marcel Marceau's troupe.

Her career was mainly in theatre, where she acted in the eleven works of Eugène Ionesco, earning a Molière Award for best comedian in Ionesco's The Chairs. She premiered the plays of Bertold Brecht in France, with Michel Serrault, Michel Piccoli and Laurent Terzieff.

On the big screen, she became famous at 71 for her work in the 1990 Étienne Chatiliez film Tatie Danielle, where she played the title role as a hateful and cantankerous old lady. She taught comedy from 1964 onwards and was the teacher of the actors of the Splendid troupe, including Gérard Jugnot, Michel Blanc, and Thierry Lhermitte.

Death

Chelton died at 93 in Brussels, Belgium.

Her ashes were buried in the Père Lachaise Cemetery, Paris.

Theatre 
1952 : The underground lovers by Jean Tardieu, directed by Sylvain Dhomme, Théâtre Lancry
1952 : The Chairs by Eugène Ionesco, directed by Sylvain Dhomme, Théâtre Lancry
1953 : Victimes du devoir by Eugène Ionesco, directed by Jacques Mauclair, Théâtre du Quartier latin, Théâtre des Célestins
1953 : La Femme du condamné by Henri Monnier, Théâtre des Célestins
1954 : Man Equals Man by Bertolt Brecht, directed by Jean-Marie Serreau, Théâtre des Célestins, Théâtre de l'Œuvre
1955 : Jacques ou la soumission by Eugène Ionesco, directed by Robert Postec, Théâtre de la Huchette
1955 : Le Tableau by Eugène Ionesco, directed by Robert Postec, Théâtre de la Huchette
1956 : L'Impromptu de l'Alma by Eugène Ionesco, directed by Maurice Jacquemont, Studio des Champs-Élysées
1956 : Les Chaises by Eugène Ionesco, directed by Jacques Mauclair, Studio des Champs-Élysées, Théâtre des Célestins
1957 : A Marriage Proposal by Anton Tchekhov, directed by Maurice Jacquemont, Théâtre de l'Ambigu
1957 : The House of Bernarda Alba by Federico García Lorca, directed by Maurice Jacquemont, Théâtre de l'Ambigu
1957 : Pericles, Prince of Tyre by William Shakespeare, directed by René Dupuy, Théâtre de l'Ambigu
1958 : Les Carabiniers by Beniamino Joppolo, directed by Michel de Ré, Théâtre d'Aujourd'hui
1960 : Victimes du devoir by Eugène Ionesco, directed by Jacques Mauclair, Aix-en-Provence
1960 : Les Chaises by Eugène Ionesco, directed by Jacques Mauclair, Studio des Champs-Élysées
1961 : Les Chaises by Eugène Ionesco, directed by Jacques Mauclair, Studio des Champs-Élysées
1961 : Les Nourrices by Romain Weingarten, directed by the author, Théâtre de Lutèce
1962 : Chemises de nuit by Eugène Ionesco, François Billetdoux and Jean Vauthier, directed by Antoine Bourseiller, Théâtre des Champs-Elysées
1962 : Délire à deux by Eugène Ionesco, directed by Antoine Bourseiller, Studio des Champs-Élysées
1962 : La Brigitta by Jacques Audiberti, directed by François Maistre, Théâtre de l'Athénée
1962 : Lulu by Frank Wedekind, directed by François Maistre, Théâtre de l'Athénée
1962 : Exit the King by Eugène Ionesco, directed by Jacques Mauclair, Théâtre de l'Alliance française
1963 : Exit the King by Eugène Ionesco, directed by Jacques Mauclair, Festival du Jeune Théâtre Liège
1963 : Les Salutations and Scène à quatre by Eugène Ionesco, directed by Jacques Mauclair, Festival du Jeune Théâtre Liège
1963 : Célimare le bien-aimé by Eugène Labiche and Alfred Delacour, directed by Jacques Mauclair, Théâtre de l'Alliance française
1964 : Richard III by Shakespeare, directed by Jean Anouilh and Roland Piétri, Théâtre Montparnasse
1965 : The Chairs by Eugène Ionesco, directed by Jacques Mauclair, Théâtre Gramont
1966 : Spectacle Beckett-Ionesco-Pinget including Délire à deux by Eugène Ionesco, directed by Jean-Louis Barrault, Odéon-Théâtre de France
1966 : Exit the King by Eugène Ionesco, directed by Jacques Mauclair, Théâtre de l'Athénée
1967 : The Chairs by Eugène Ionesco, directed by Jacques Mauclair, Théâtre Gramont
1968 : Exit the King by Eugène Ionesco, directed by Jacques Mauclair, Festival de la Cité Carcassonne Théâtre du Midi
1969 : Exit the King by Eugène Ionesco, directed by Jacques Mauclair, Festival de Bellac, Festivals d'été
1969 : The Chairs by Eugène Ionesco, directed by Jacques Mauclair, tournée
1969 : Au théâtre ce soir : Many d'Alfred Adam, directed by Pierre Dux, producer Pierre Sabbagh, Théâtre Marigny
1970 : Exit the King by Eugène Ionesco, directed by Jacques Mauclair, Théâtre de l'Athénée
1970 : Les Adieux de la Grande Duchesse by Bernard Da Costa, directed by Jacques Mauclair, Poche Montparnasse
1971 : Les Chaises by Eugène Ionesco, directed by Jacques Mauclair, Théâtre de l'Alliance française
1971 : La Lacune by Eugène Ionesco, directed by Jacques Mauclair, Théâtre de l'Alliance française
1971 : La Jeune Fille à marier by Eugène Ionesco, directed by Jacques Mauclair, Théâtre de l'Alliance française
1972 : Le Saut du lit by Ray Cooney and John Chapman, directed by Jean Le Poulain, Théâtre Montparnasse
1973 : Exit the King by Eugène Ionesco, directed by Jacques Mauclair, Festival d'Angers
1975 : Les Adieux de la Grande Duchesse by Bernard Da Costa, directed by Jacques Mauclair, Théâtre Rive Gauche
1975 : L'Homme aux valises by Eugène Ionesco, directed by Jacques Mauclair, Théâtre de l'Atelier
1976 : La Reine de la nuit by Christian Giudicelli, directed by Gérard Caillaud, Théâtre de Plaisance
1976 : The Chairs by Eugène Ionesco, directed by Jacques Mauclair, Théâtre des Célestins, Théâtre de Boulogne-Billancourt
1977 : Le Sexe faible by Édouard Bourdet, directed by Jean Meyer, Théâtre des Célestins
1978 : Les Plaideurs by Racine, directed by Jean Meyer, Théâtre des Célestins
1978 : The Chairs by Eugène Ionesco, directed by Jacques Mauclair, Théâtre du Marais
1978 : Au théâtre ce soir : Vous ne l'emporterez pas avec vous de Moss Hart and George Kaufman, directed by Jean-Luc Moreau, producer Pierre Sabbagh, Théâtre Marigny
1978 : Au théâtre ce soir : Brocéliande de Henry de Montherlant, directed by Jean Meyer, producer Pierre Sabbagh, Théâtre Marigny
 1981 : Au théâtre ce soir : Mort ou vif de Max Régnier, directed by Christian Duroc, producer Pierre Sabbagh, Théâtre Marigny
1987 : Crucifixion dans un boudoir turc by Jean Gruault, directed by Guy Michel, Théâtre de l'Odéon
1987 : Reine mère by Mainlo Santinelli, directed by José Quaglio, Théâtre de Poche Montparnasse
1988 : Le Saut du lit by Ray Cooney and John Chapman, directed by Jean Le Poulain, Théâtre des Variétés
1991 : En conduisant Miss Daisy by Alfred Uhry, directed by Gérard Vergez, Théâtre Antoine
1993 : The Chairs by Eugène Ionesco, directed by Jacques Mauclair, Théâtre du Marais
1996 : Le Mal de mère by Pierre-Olivier Scotto, directed by Françoise Seigner, Théâtre de la Madeleine
1997 : Le Mal de mère by Pierre-Olivier Scotto, directed by Françoise Seigner, Théâtre des Célestins
1998 : Le Mal de mère by Pierre-Olivier Scotto, directed by Françoise Seigner, Théâtre du Palais-Royal
2000 : Le ciel est égoïste by Pierre-Olivier Scotto and Martine Feldmann, directed by Pierre Aufrey, Théâtre du Palais-Royal, Théâtre Montansier
2001 : Une femme de lettres and Un bi-choco sous le sofa by Alan Bennett, directed by Jean-Claude Idée, Théâtre Tristan-Bernard

Filmography

Awards
1991: nominated to the César of best actress for Tatie Danielle.
1991: nominated to the Molière of comedy for En conduisant Miss Daisy.
1994: Molière of comedy for Les Chaises.
1997: nominated to the Molière of comedy for Le Mal de mère.
2000: knight of the Légion d'honneur
2008: best female interpretation at the San Sebastián International Film Festival for La Boîte de Pandore.
2009: best female interpretation at the Festival du film d’aventures de Valenciennes for La Boîte de Pandore and Sœur Sourire.
2009: Best Performance of the 27th Fajr International Film Festival ("World Panorama" section) for Pandora's Box, along with Derya Alabora and Ovul Avkiran

Notes and references

External links

Tsilla Chelton obituary from The Guardian

1919 births
2012 deaths
20th-century French actresses
21st-century French actresses
Burials at Père Lachaise Cemetery
Actresses from Paris
French film actresses
French stage actresses
French television actresses
20th-century French Jews
Expatriates in Mandatory Palestine
French expatriates in Belgium
French expatriates in Switzerland